Edmonton/Gartner Airport  is located  south of Edmonton, Alberta, Canada.

See also
List of airports in the Edmonton Metropolitan Region

References

External links
 Page about this airport on COPA's Places to Fly airport directory

Registered aerodromes in Alberta
Aviation in Edmonton
Leduc County